NME: The Cool List 2005 is a compilation album released by British music magazine NME to correspond with their 2005 Cool List. It was covermounted on the 26 November 2005 issue of the magazine, and includes tracks from several of the artists who were featured in the list. Discussing the album, senior marketing manager Nick New remarked: "The NME Cool List CD is a great way of NME showcasing what we do best – NME bringing exciting new bands to our readers!"

Track listing

References

External links

2005 compilation albums
New Musical Express
2005 in British music